The Pertjajah Luhur is a political party in Suriname. Founded in 1998 by Paul Somohardjo, it represents Javanese Surinamese. At the last legislative elections (25 May 2010), the party was part of the People's Alliance for Progress that won 13.0% of the popular vote and six out of 51 seats in the National Assembly. Out of these six seats, all went to Somoharjdo.

Electoral history

References

Political parties in Suriname
Political parties of minorities
Political parties established in 1998
1998 establishments in Suriname